FK Crvena Zvezda is a Serbian football club based in Novi Sad. As of 2020/21 season, they play in Vojvodina League South (4th rank of Serbian football leagues).

The club was established in 1952. Ever since, they play on the same field in Vidovdansko Naselje neighborhood.

References
Crvena Zvezda Novi Sad, SrbijaSport.net

External links
FK Crvena Zvezda on Facebook

Crvena Zvezda Novi Sad
Crvena Zvezda
1952 establishments in Serbia